There are currently no operational airlines of North Macedonia.

Defunct airlines

See also 
List of airlines

References